The Curse is a 1924 Austrian drama film directed by Robert Land and starring Lilian Harvey, Oscar Beregi and Albert Heine. It was shot at the Sievering Studios.

The film marked the screen debut of Lilian Harvey who would go on to become one of the top stars at the German box office during the late Weimar and early Nazi eras. Harvey was in Vienna at the time because she was appearing in a stage revue show.

Plot
A young Jewish woman in an Eastern European shtetl struggles  to reconcile her aspirations with her duty to her family. As her lifestyle grows wilder, her mother is shocked by her immoral behaviour and commits suicide by drowning - repeating "the curse" which has haunted the family for centuries.

Cast
Lilian Harvey as Ruth
Oscar Beregi as Jehuda Nachmann
Albert Heine as Esra
Ferdinand Bonn as Rabbi Eliser
Isak Deutsch as pimp
 as housekeeper
Anny Hornik as Lea
Reinhold Häussermann as matchmaker
Ria Jászonyi as Rahel
 as midwife
Ferdinand Mayerhofer as doctor
Milena Mudin as Miriam, waiter
Anton Pointner
Eugen Preiß as Acolyte
Otto Schmöle as Gatekeeper
Hans Thimig as Sinche

References

Bibliography

External links

1924 films
1924 drama films
Austrian silent feature films
Austrian drama films
Films directed by Robert Land
Austrian black-and-white films
Films shot at Sievering Studios
1925 drama films
1925 films
Silent drama films